The 1990 United Nations Security Council election was held on 1 November 1990 during the Forty-fifth session of the United Nations General Assembly, held at United Nations Headquarters in New York City. The General Assembly elected Austria, Belgium, Ecuador, India, and Zimbabwe, as the five new non-permanent members of the UN Security Council for two-year mandates commencing on 1 January 1991.

Rules
The Security Council has 15 seats, filled by five permanent members and ten non-permanent members. Each year, half of the non-permanent members are elected for two-year terms. A sitting member may not immediately run for re-election.

In accordance with the rules whereby the ten non-permanent UNSC seats rotate among the various regional blocs into which UN member states traditionally divide themselves for voting and representation purposes, the five available seats are allocated as follows:

One for African countries (held by Ethiopia)
One for countries from the Asian Group (now called the Asia-Pacific Group) (held by Malaysia)
One for Latin America and the Caribbean (held by Brazil)
Two for the Western European and Others Group (held by Canada and Finland)

To be elected, a candidate must receive a two-thirds majority of those present and voting. If the vote is inconclusive after the first round, three rounds of restricted voting shall take place, followed by three rounds of unrestricted voting, and so on, until a result has been obtained. In restricted voting, only official candidates may be voted on, while in unrestricted voting, any member of the given regional group, with the exception of current Council members, may be voted on.

Result
Voting was conducted on a single ballot. Ballots containing more states from a certain region than seats allocated to that region were invalidated. There was a total of 154 ballot papers.

Note *: The President had stated before the balloting began that votes for States outside the relevant region would not be counted, consequently, the votes for this Eastern European State should not have been included in the results.

See also
List of members of the United Nations Security Council
India and the United Nations

References

External links
UN Document A/45/PV.36 Official record of General Assembly meeting, 1 November 1990

1990 elections
1990
Non-partisan elections
1990 in international relations